Viviez is a commune in the Aveyron department in the Occitanie region in southern France. Viviez-Decazeville station has rail connections to Brive-la-Gaillarde, Figeac and Rodez.

Population

See also
Communes of the Aveyron department

References

Communes of Aveyron
Aveyron communes articles needing translation from French Wikipedia